GlobaLeaks is an open-source, free software intended to enable secure and anonymous whistleblowing initiatives.

History
The project started on 15 December 2010 and the first software prototype was announced on 6 September 2011.

Relevant figures in the first development are Arturo Filastò, Claudio Agosti, Fabio Pietrosanti, Giovanni Pellerano, Michele Orrù.

Operation
GlobaLeaks utilizes Tor Onion Services in order to guarantee the anonymity of the source.

Once the submission is performed the data is encrypted and made available only to configured recipients. The platform does not store anything permanently and the submitted information and files are deleted as soon as possible with a strict data retention policy.

The process is generally improved by suggesting sources and recipients to use Qubes OS or Tails operating systems while connecting to the platform.

Implementations
By 2023, GlobaLeaks has been internationalized in 90+ languages and implemented by several thousands projects and initiatives all over the world. The vast range of adopters include independent media, activists, media agencies, corporations, and more.

In 2013, Free Press Unlimited (FPU), a Netherland-based non-profit organization, created Publeaks NL a foundation that counts around 20 of the country's biggest media organizations among its members that uses the platform to perform investigative journalism under a same umbrella project.

FPU has replicated this successful model in other countries creating MéxicoLeaks, IndonesiaLeaks, Leaks.ng and Kenekanko in Mexico, Indonesia, Nigeria and Mali respectively. MexicoLeaks aimed at revealing information for the public interest in Mexico was awarded in 2016 the FRIDA award. Another project, Africaleaks, was discontinued.

AWP, a Belgium-based organization, created Ljost (Iceland), Filtrala (Spain), EcuadorTransparente (Ecuador) and PeruLeaks (Peru).

One of the most successful GlobaLeaks projects is WildLeaks, the world's first whistleblower initiative dedicated to Wildlife and Forest Crime funded and managed by the Elephant Action League (EAL) which reported and investigated various crimes. One of the investigations was highlighted in the award-winning Netflix documentary The Ivory Game.

GlobaLeaks also partnered with major anticorruption and human rights NGOs like Transparency International (Allerta Anticorruzione), OCCRP (OCCRPLeaks) and Amnesty International (Amlea).

In 2017, Xnet, an activist project which has been working on and for networked democracy and digital rights since 2008, launched in the Barcelona City Hall the first public Anti-Corruption Complaint Box using anonymity protection technology like Tor and GlobaLeaks ("Bústia Ètica" in Catalan). With this pioneering project, the Barcelona City Hall is the first municipal government to invite citizens to use tools which enable them to send information in a way that is secure, that guarantees privacy and gives citizens the option to be totally anonymous.

In 2018 the Italian Anti-Corruption Authority (ANAC), an administrative watchdog, launched their national online whistleblowing platform using GlobaLeaks and onion services, giving whistleblowers who come forward a secure way to report illegal activity while protecting their identities.

Since 2020 the software is now recommended by Transparency International among the available secure, ethical and free solutions that could be used to implement whistleblowing systems for anticorruption purposes.

Funding
The GlobaLeaks project maintains public and transparent documentation of the funds and partners that have supported its research and development.

See also

 SecureDrop
 Whistleblowing
 WikiLeaks

References

External links
 

2011 software
Activism
Free content management systems
Free software
Free software programmed in Python
Free system software
Investigative journalism
Python (programming language) software
Software using the GNU AGPL license
Sources (journalism)
Tor (anonymity network)
Tor onion services
Whistleblowing
Whistleblower support organizations